Spy is a village of Wallonia and a district of the municipality of Jemeppe-sur-Sambre, located in the province of Namur, Belgium.

Recently Yves Saquet found a third skeleton of the same age.

See also
 Grotte de Spy

References

External links
 

Former municipalities of Namur (province)
Belgium geography articles needing translation from French Wikipedia